Botanical gardens in Iran have collections consisting entirely of Iran native and endemic species; most have a collection that include plants from around the world. There are botanical gardens and arboreta in all states and territories of Iran, most are administered by local governments, some are privately owned.

 Eram Botanical Garden, Shiraz
 Jahanara Botanical Garden, Tehran
 National Botanical Garden of Iran, Chitgar area, Tehran
 Noshahr Botanical Garden, Noshahr
 Mashhad Botanical Garden, Mashhad

References 

Iran
Botanical gardens